Paid Vacation is the fourth studio album by American singer/songwriter Richard Marx, released in 1994.

The album features "Now and Forever", Marx's ninth and final Top 10 hit on the U.S. Billboard Hot 100 and most successful single on the Adult Contemporary chart. It was issued as a lead single for the album and stayed atop the Billboard A/C chart for 11 consecutive weeks. The follow-up single "The Way She Loves Me" also achieved in Billboard, reaching the Top 20 on the Hot 100 and hitting #3 at Adult Contemporary radio.

However, the album itself was less successful than his previous efforts. During a 23-week-long chart run on the U. S. Billboard 200, Paid Vacation only reached #37 and failed to climb higher than its predecessor Rush Street (#35). Nevertheless, received his fourth successive Platinum certification from the Recording Industry Association of America in late 1994. The album sold well globally, especially in Japan, providing Marx with his first Gold record in that country. It was also a success in Southeast Asia, where it sold over 1.1 million copies by 1995, alongside Ballads.

The album was dedicated to Marx's then-wife Cynthia Rhodes and sons Brandon, Lucas, and Jesse Marx.

Track listing
All songs written and composed by Richard Marx, except where noted.
International release
"The Way She Loves Me" – 4:15
"One More Try" (Marx, Bruce Gaitsch) – 4:25
"Silent Scream" – 3:52
"Nothing to Hide" (Marx, Terry Thomas) – 5:33
"Whole World to Save" (Marx, Fee Waybill) – 5:31 
"Soul Motion" (Marx, Gaitsch) – 5:22
"Now and Forever" – 3:32
"Goodbye Hollywood" – 4:56
"Heaven's Waiting" – 3:48
"Nothing Left Behind Us" (Marx, Waybill) – 5:22
"What You Want" – 3:49
"One Man" – 5:12
"Miami 2017 (Seen the Lights Go Out on Broadway)" (Billy Joel) – 4:32 
"Baby Blues" (Marx, Gaitsch) – 0:53

Personnel 
 Richard Marx – lead vocals, backing vocals (1, 3-6, 8-11), arrangements (1-5, 8, 10–12), horn arrangements (1), keyboards (2, 8), acoustic guitars (4), "Ooh" vocals (5), additional keyboards (6), finger snaps (9), acoustic piano (10, 13)
 Bill Champlin – organ (1, 11, 12), backing vocals (5, 11), BGV arrangement (11)
 Bill Payne – keyboards (3), organ (10), acoustic piano solo (10)
 David Innis – organ (4)
 Greg Phillinganes – Fender Rhodes (5), keyboards (6)
 Michael Egizi – keyboards (13)
 Bruce Gaitsch – arrangements (1, 2), guitars (1–3, 6, 8-12), acoustic guitar (7), mandolin (7)
 Terry Thomas – guitars (4), backing vocals (4), arrangements (4)
 Paul Warren – guitars (5, 13), guitar solo (12)
 Leland Sklar – arrangements (1), bass (1, 8, 12)
 Randy Jackson – bass (2, 3, 5, 6, 9–11, 13), finger snaps (9)
 Nathan East – bass (7)
 Jonathan Moffett – drums (1, 2, 6, 8-11), finger snaps (9)
 Russ Kunkel – drums (3)
 Tony Baird – drums (4)
 Jeff Porcaro – drums (12)
 Myron Grombacher – drums (13)
 Luis Conte – percussion (3)
 Chris Trujillo – percussion (3, 5)
 Ross Garfield – finger snaps (9)
 Steve Grove – saxophone (1, 5)
 Lee Thornburg – trombone (1), trumpet (1)
 John "Juke" Logan – harmonica (11)
 Lionel Richie – backing vocals (1)
 Luther Vandross – backing vocals (1)
 Cheryl Lynn – backing vocals (4)
 Marilyn Martin – backing vocals (4, 8)
 Max Carl – backing vocals (5, 11)
 Ruth Marx – "Ooh" vocals (5)
 Timothy B. Schmit – backing vocals (8)
 Vince Gill – backing vocals (10)

Strings on "Now and Forever"
 Dick Marx – string arrangements 
 Israel Baker, Farhad Behroozi, Charlie Bisharat, Henry Corbett, Gailt Curz, Pavel Farkas, James Getzoff, Jerry Goodman and Sid Page – string players

Production 
 Producers – Richard Marx (Tracks 1–3, 5-13); Terry Thomas (Track 4).
 Lead vocals on Tracks 3, 5 & 10 co-produced by Fee Waybill.
 Engineers – Bill Drescher (Tracks 1–3, 5-12); Bruce Gaitsch (Tracks 3 & 4); Richard Marx (Track 4); Rob Jacobs (Track 4); Terry Thomas (Track 4); Peter Doell (Track 13).
 Mixing – Bill Drescher (Tracks 1, 3, 5-13); Mike Shipley (Track 2); Rafe McKenna (Track 4).
 Mastered by Wally Traugott
 Production Coordination – Susanne Marie Edgren
 Art Direction – Larry Vigon
 Design – Brian Johnson and Larry Vigon
 Photography – Nels Israelson
 Inner Photos – Al Silfen
 Management – Left Bank Management

Charts

Weekly charts

Year-end charts

Certifications

References

1994 albums
Richard Marx albums
Albums produced by Richard Marx
Capitol Records albums